
Gmina Dąbie is an urban-rural gmina (administrative district) in Koło County, Greater Poland Voivodeship, in west-central Poland.

Villages
Apart from the town of Dąbie, Gmina Dąbie contains the villages and settlements of Augustynów, Baranowiec, Chełmno nad Nerem, Chełmno-Parcele, Chruścin, Cichmiana, Domanin, Gaj, Grabina Wielka, Karszew, Krzewo, Krzykosy, Kupinin, Ladorudz, Lisice, Lutomirów, Majdany, Rośle Duże, Rzuchów, Sobótka, Tarnówka, Tarnówka Wiesiołowska, Wiesiołów and Zalesie-Kolonia.

Neighbouring gminas
Gmina Dąbie is bordered by the gminas of Brudzew, Grabów, Grzegorzew, Koło, Kościelec, Olszówka, Świnice Warckie and Uniejów.

References
Polish official population figures 2006

Dabie
Koło County